MEGA Channel, also known as MEGA TV or just MEGA, is a television network in Greece, that broadcasts a mix of foreign and Greek programming.

It is the first and the oldest private television network in Greece.

History

Mega Channel (1989–2018)

Mega is the first private television station to launch in Greece on 20 November 1989 and was the trade name of Teletypos S.A. (Τηλέτυπος A.E.)

The channel regularly achieved the top ratings spot in Greece through its varied programming including comedies, dramas, news, current affairs and entertainment shows. Examples include the popular Greek comedies Sto Para Pente, Savatogenimmenes and Maria, i Aschimi.

The channel was also granted the rights to Victoria Hislop's novel The Island. This became a 26 episode drama series called To Nisi. The show was the most expensive show in Greek television history with a budget of €4 million.

Financial problems and subsequent closure
Since 2012, the parent company had been experiencing financial issues due to poor borrowing practises. In 2016, the channels debts were reported to be approximately €116 million. At the same time, reports of staff being unpaid began to emerge.

In 2016, it was reported that the company was restructuring loans in order to continue operations. This was despite the fact the company didn't proceed with a share capital increase of 15 million euros that was agreed in exchange for the banks agreeing to extend their return to 2021.

The staff of Mega Channel continued to keep the channel on air despite not being paid and being ignored by the parent company. The decision was taken to cease all news and live programming and instead focus on rebroadcasting content from their extensive program library without commercial breaks.

Mega continued broadcasting until it was removed from the platforms. The channel was removed by Digea (the company responsible for digital over-the-air broadcasting in Greece) at 02:08:36 on the morning of 28th October 2018. The channel was then also removed from pay-TV platforms on 20 November 2018. The channel did continue to broadcast via online streaming from its webpage.

Sale of assets
On 1 November 2019, the Mega Channel branding, logo and vast program library were put up for auction.

The winning bid of €33,999,999 belonged to Alter Ego Mass Media Co. S.A.

Mega Channel (2020–present)
Following the auction, plans were put in place to re-launch Mega.

On 17 February 2020, the channel relaunched with a variety of live programming, news, movies and selected programs from its program library.

The channel is currently using the familiar 'Mega Mou' (My Mega) on-screen branding that was originally used between 2010 and 2014 as well as the new tag line of Mega όπως πάντα! (Mega as always!) However, on June 27, 2021, the channel retired the 'Mega Mou' branding and began to use a new ident package in which objects form the logo.

Under the ownership of Alter Ego, the channel is now located at 340 Syngrou Avenue in Kallithea, Athens.

Current Programming

Programming for the 2022-2023 broadcasting season include:

Greek
Current shows include:
Koinonia Ora Mega (Community Time MEGA) - A revamped version of its predecessor (Koinonia Ora 8). Current affairs show that examines the issues affecting everyday people in Greece and abroad. Features discussion with in-studio guests. The show is hosted by Iordanis Hasapopoulos and Anthi Voulgari. Airs Monday - Friday at 05:00.
Live News - hosted by Nikos Evaggelatos. Airs Monday - Friday at 16:20.
Mega Gegonota (Mega News) - Daily newscast in Greek featuring news from Greece and around the world. Airs daily 12:45 & 19:45 (hosted by Dora Anagnostopoulou at 12:45, Rania Tzima on weekdays except Fridays at 19:45, Katerina Panagopoulou on Fridays and weekends at 19:45 and George Evgenidis on weekends at 12:45).
Mega Savvatokiriako (Mega Weekend) - Morning show for the weekend. It features news, sports highlights, current affairs and more. Hosted by Dinos Siomopoulos and Stella Gadona. Airs Saturday & Sunday at 05:00.
MEGA Stories - hosted by Dora Anagnostopoulou. Airs Tuesday at 00:10.
Super Balla Live - Sports Broadcast hosted by Antonis Karpetopoulos. Every Sunday at 23:50.
Pame Danai (Let's go Danai) - hosted by Danai Barka. Airs Monday - Friday at 10:45.
Mega Kalimera (Mega Good Morning) - hosted by Eleonora Meleti. Airs Monday - Friday at 07:45.
Ti Les Twra! (What are you talking about Now!) - hosted by Katerina Karavatou. Airs Saturday & Sunday at 13:45.
Celebrity Game Night - hosted by Smaragda Karidi. Airs Friday at 22:00.
Mega Star - hosted by Manto Gasteratou and Antonis Dimitriadis. Airs Saturday at 16:30.
Fos Sto Tounel - hosted by Aggeliki Nikolouli. Airs Fridays at 23:20.
The Chase - hosted by Maria Mpekatorou. Airs Monday - Friday at 18:40.

Current series include:
I Gi Tis Elias - drama
Komanta Kai Drakoi - drama
Simpetheri apo ta tirana - comedy
To Aurio Mas Anikei - drama
O Daskalos - comedy

Foreign series
Mr. Mercedes - American crime drama.
For Life - American legal drama.
Forensic Files - American documentary-style.
Outlander - American historical drama.
When Calls the Heart - Canadian-American romantic drama.
CSI: Miami - American police procedural drama

Slogans and branding
Mega Channel (1989–2019)
1989–1999: Το Θέαμα Αρχίζει (The spectacle begins)
1989–1999: Το Μεγάλο Kανάλι στη μικρή οθόνη (The Big Channel on the small screen)
1999–2000: 10 Χρόνια Mega (10 Years Mega)
2000–2002: Ραντεβού στο Mega (Meet on Mega)
2002–2004: Όλοι Mega (Everyone Mega)
2004–2005: I love TV
2005–09/2009: Megalicious
09/2009–02/2010: Το Mega είναι 20 (Mega is 20)
02/2010–10/2014: Mega mou (My Mega)
10/2014–12/2019: Mega Mega

Unofficial slogans
07/2016–12/2019: Με την άδειά σας, συνεχίζουμε (With your permission, we continue)
11/2019–12/2019: 30 Χρόνια Mega (30 years Mega)

Mega Channel (2020–present)
02/2020–06/2021: Mega Mou (My Mega)
02/2020–06/2021: Mega όπως πάντα! (Mega as always!)
06/2021–present: Το Mega το καλό (The great Mega)

Logo and copyrights
The original Mega logo consisted of 10 or 12 multicoloured lines with MEGA in the middle with the word channel located at the bottom.

Mega then launched a new logo in 1999 with the text 'MEGA', with 'ME' widened to the left and 'GA' widened to the right. This logo is still in use today.

The channel does regularly refresh its on-screen branding using the current seasons slogan. The channel also uses special idents at Christmas and Easter.

MEGA Cosmos

MEGA Cosmos is the international service of Mega Channel that broadcasts the 'best of Mega' programming to Greeks abroad. It was first launched as Mega Channel Australia and then re-branded to Mega Cosmos using a common feed for Australia and North America.

In October 2022, MEGA Cosmos re-launched in Canada via Odyssey Television Network, available via Bell Fibe TV, Bell Satellite TV & Rogers Cable.

The original incarnation of MEGA Cosmos was available in
Australia via UBI World TV and later via the Ellas TV platform (IPTV).
USA via Dish Network and the Ellas TV platform (IPTV).

Ownership

Current
Alter Ego Mass Media Co. S.A. - Epixeirisi Meson Mazikis Enimerosis

Former
Teletypos S.A. of Television Programmes (100%)
Alter Ego Mass Media Co. S.A. - Epixeirisi Meson Mazikis Enimerosis (22,11%)
Elenovo Ltd. - Anna Leonidou (19,63%)
Pegasus Publications S.A. (13,09%)
HSBC Private Bank (Suisse) S.A. (4,88%)
GS Bank (4,80%)
Moongold Investments Limited (3,32%)
Baltazzi Investments Limited (3,26%)
Goodlass Investments Limited (3,26%)
Opalton Investments Limited (3,26%)
Benbay Limited - Victoras Restis (3,19%)
Saran Holdings S.A. SPF (2,81%)
Prime Applications S.A. - Dimitris Kopelouzos (2,68%)
Elkin Holdings S.A. (2,33%)
Ascope Trading Limited (1,55%)
EOK Equity Limited (1,32%)
WAKO Investments S.A. (1,04%)
Cyrenia Enterprises S.A. (1,02%)
LAGAN Enterprises S.A. (1,02%)
Tone Business S.A. (1,02%)
Valens Trading S.A. (1,02%)
Rest shareholders (3,39%)

Participations
Teletypos Cyprus Ltd: 100% subsidiary (main business mainly in the purchase and sale of programmes, know-how etc. in the markets of Cyprus and the Middle East)
NETMED NV, Dutch cable television company: 12,5%
Former participations:
Multichoice Hellas S.A., Greek cable television company: 42%, in 2003, 33% were transferred to Teletypos Cyprus but already in 2004 all 42% were exchanged with a 12.5% participation in the Dutch cable television company NETMED NV.

See also
Omega TV Cyprus
Television in Greece
List of Greek-language television channels

External links
 
MEGA Cosmos
Profile of TELETIPOS S.A. on the website of the Athens Stock Exchange

Television channels in Greece
Greek-language television stations
Television channels and stations established in 1989
1989 establishments in Greece
Television networks in Greece
Mass media in Athens